Bror Ingvar Petersson (3 September 1922 in Kalmar, Sweden — 21 February 2010 in Solna, Sweden) was a Swedish footballer who played as a midfielder. He made 111 Allsvenskan appearances for Djurgårdens IF.

He is the father of footballer Bo Petersson.

Honours
Djurgårdens IF
 Allsvenskan: 1954–55

References

1922 births
2010 deaths
Association football midfielders
Swedish footballers
Allsvenskan players
Djurgårdens IF Fotboll players
People from Kalmar
Sportspeople from Kalmar County